Whirlwind is the fourth album by singer-songwriter Andrew Gold. It was released in 1980 on Asylum Records. It is Gold's final major label album and last solo album of any kind for over a decade.

Reception
Rolling Stone's Stephen Holden called Whirlwind "a well-crafted album of imitation rock by a pop sentimentalist unconvincingly crying tough." Concluding "the record merely reaffirms Andrew Gold's skill as a meticulous pop interior designer recycling Sixties guitar hooks into blandly tasteful studio settings." Reviewers of Billboard noticed that this album was more rocking then two previous works.

AllMusic's James Chrispell retrospectively noted "[t]he hits were not forthcoming" and the "album came and went in nearly the blink of an eye, and not much else was heard from Andrew Gold's once-promising solo career."

Track listing 
All songs written by Andrew Gold, except where noted.

Personnel 
 Andrew Gold – lead vocals, guitars, organ (1, 4, 8), percussion (1, 9), synthesizers (2, 9), acoustic piano (3, 9), keyboards (7), tambourine (8), backing vocals (8)
 Don Grolnick – acoustic piano (5)
 Waddy Wachtel – 2nd lead guitar (5)
 Bryan Garofalo – bass (1-4, 6-9)
 Kenny Edwards – bass (5)
 Mike Botts – drums (1-4, 6-9)
 Rick Marotta – drums (5)
 Brock Walsh – backing vocals

Production 
 Andrew Gold – producer
 Greg Ladanyi – engineer
 Jim Nipar – engineer
 Doug Sax – mastering 
 The Mastering Lab (Hollywood, California) – mastering location 
 Melanie McDowell – production assistant 
 Ron Coro – art direction, design 
 Jim Shea – photography 
 Norman Epstein – management 
 Ron Weiss – management

References

1980 albums
Andrew Gold albums
albums produced by Andrew Gold
Asylum Records albums